Ranularia is a genus of predatory sea snails, marine gastropod mollusks in the family Cymatiidae.

Species
Species within the genus Ranularia include:

 Ranularia andamanensis (Beu, 1987)
 Ranularia arthuri (Beu, 1987)
 Ranularia boschi (Abbott & Lewis, 1970)
 Ranularia caudata (Gmelin, 1791)
 Ranularia cynocephala (Lamarck, 1816)
 Ranularia dunkeri (Lischke, 1868)
 Ranularia encaustica (Reeve, 1844)
 Ranularia exilis (Reeve, 1844)
 Ranularia gallinago (Reeve, 1844)
 Ranularia gutturnia (Röding, 1798)
 Ranularia monilifera (A. Adams & Reeve, 1850)
 Ranularia oblita Lewis & Beu, 1976
 Ranularia oboesa (Perry, 1811)
 Ranularia parthi (Arthur, 1991)
 Ranularia pyrulum (A. Adams & Reeve, 1850)
 Ranularia pyrum (Linnaeus, 1758)
 Ranularia rehderi (A.H. Verrill, 1950)
 Ranularia sarcostoma (Reeve, 1844)
 Ranularia sinensis (Reeve, 1844)
 Ranularia springsteeni (Beu, 1987)
 Ranularia testudinaria (A. Adams & Reeve, 1850)
 Ranularia trilineata (Reeve, 1844)
 Ranularia tripa (Lamarck, 1822)

Synonyms
 Ranularia (Lagena) Mörch, 1852: synonym of Gelagna Schaufuss, 1869 (Invalid: junior homonym of Lagena Röding, 1798 and Lagena Schumacher, 1817; Gelagna and Paralagena are replacement names)
 Ranularia clavator (Dillwyn, 1817): synonym of Ranularia gutturnia (Röding, 1798)
 Ranularia labiata Schumacher, 1817: synonym of Ranularia gutturnia (Röding, 1798)
 Ranularia longirostra Schumacher, 1817: synonym of Ranularia gutturnia (Röding, 1798)
 Ranularia muricina (Röding, 1798): synonym of Gutturnium muricinum (Röding, 1798)
 Ranularia retusa (Lamarck, 1822): synonym of Ranularia oboesa (Perry, 1811)
 Ranularia tuberosus (Lamarck, 1822): synonym of Gutturnium muricinum (Röding, 1798)

References

 Beu A.G. 2010 [August]. Neogene tonnoidean gastropods of tropical and South America: contributions to the Dominican Republic and Panama Paleontology Projects and uplift of the Central American Isthmus. Bulletins of American Paleontology 377-378: 550 pp, 79 pls. - note: treated as full genus

External links
 Schumacher, C. F. (1817). Essai d'un nouveau système des habitations des vers testacés. Schultz, Copenghagen. iv + 288 pp., 22 pls

Cymatiidae